The 2015 Prairie View A&M Panthers football team represented Prairie View A&M University in the 2015 NCAA Division I FCS football season. The Panthers were led by first year head coach Willie Simmons and played their home games at Waller ISD Football Stadium in Waller, Texas due to renovations at Edward L. Blackshear Field. They were a member of the West Division of the Southwestern Athletic Conference (SWAC). They finished the season 8–2, 8–1 in SWAC play to finish in second place in the West Division.

Schedule

± University of Faith did not meet NCAA accreditation guidelines and all stats and records from this game do not count.

References

Prairie View AandM
Prairie View A&M Panthers football seasons
Prairie View AandM Panthers football